Peramangalam is an Indian village in the Indian state of Kerala. The village is an example of religious harmony.

Geography 
It is 9.5 kilometres from Trichur. The district highways connecting Kozhikode and Guruvayoor pass through this village. A large baniyan tree on the side of a big playground. Avanavu Road, Peralthrikkovu Road, Vellitheri angadi Road are the main roads.

The tourist attraction Villangankunnu is on the southwestern side of this village.

Etymology 
Peramangalam originates from the name Veeraramamangalam, which originated from Peralthrukovu Sreeramaswami Temple there.

Governance 
It is a part of Kaiparambu Grama Panchayat, bordering Adat Grama Panchayat.

Religion
The village hosts multiple faiths:
 Thechikkotukavu Bhagavathy Temple
 Peramangalam St. Mary's Church
 Peralthrukovu Sreerama swami Temple
 Sri Poothrukavu Shiva Temple
 Cheeramkuzhy Murugan Temple

Economy 
The village hosts
 Bank Of Baroda

Education 
Peramangalam has many schools:
Sree Durga Vilasom Higher Secondary School
 Thechikootukavu Devasom College
 Vijayamatha College (situated in St. Marys church compound)
The International School Of Thrissur
Kendriya Vidyalaya
PARAMEKKAVU VIDYA MANDIR
IES Public School

Amenities 
PPF Shuttle Club, Mullaparambu Road
 Star Shuttle Club Amala Arcade
 Jaithra Nidhi Limited
 Angel homes-Avanavu Road
 Peramangalam Arts & Cultural Charitable Society [PACCS]
Highway police headquarters.

Notables
Notables from Peramangalam include:

 Kerala's tallest elephant Thechikottukavu Ramachandran".
 Communist leader Shri E.P. Marar, Dalith 
 Congress leader Shri M.P. Ayyappan
 Educationlist Kaninghat Sarojini (teacher founder of Chinmaya Mission College)
 Santhosh trophy player Lawrence, N.K. Pradeep 
 Supreme Court Advocate Subash Chandran 
 Panchavadyam expert Eravath Appu Marar
 Kathakali actor Kalamandalam Gopi

Festivals
The main festival is Vela and Pooram of Thechikottukavu temple. The feast related to St. Sebastian is another important spiritual and cultural activity.  It is celebrated in the month of January.  It is often called Makaram Perunallu [largest holy procession in the district].  Kavadiyatam is another important festival.  This one also comes in January.  This festival is attached to Cheeran Kuzi Temple.

References

Villages in Thrissur district